James Maxwell Michael Averis (born 28 May 1974 in Bristol, England) is a retired English cricket player who played for the cricket teams of Oxford University and Gloucestershire. He also played professional rugby for Harlequins and Bristol.

Early life
He attended Bristol Cathedral School and afterwards St Cross College, Oxford, on a Major Stanley's scholarship where he won blues at rugby and cricket in the same academic year.

Rugby and cricket career
James Averis built a reputation as a solid one-day performer, and in 2001 was able to make a major breakthrough into the Championship side. A stocky, powerful seam bowler, he was the club's highest wicket-taker in the National League and Championship that year.

One of several graduates in the Gloucestershire squad, Averis gained a prestigious reputation as a sportsman at Oxford. He was awarded Blues in cricket and rugby, and represented Bristol Rugby Club (making his 1st XV debut in 1994, kicking 5 penalties out of 5 against Exeter) and Harlequins before settling on cricket in 2000.

Bristol-born, he found himself thrown into the one-day side at the peak of its success at the turn of the century as the side won 8 trophies in 6 years. He claimed 29 National League victims in 2000, and continued performing very well in a less successful team performance in 2001. He also managed to hold his nerve in tense moments of the cup competitions, including the C&G final of 2004, where he claimed 4-23 including a hat trick.

His pace was a fairly constant 80+ mph, though he developed an excellent slower ball with the help of former team-mate Ian Harvey.  He relied on accuracy and late movement, as well as the surprise slower ball and yorker, to claim most of his victims.

An invaluable member of the one day side, he was a reliable fielder and decent lower order batter, who looked as though he genuinely enjoyed his cricket.  Averis retired from cricket in 2006 after 15 years at the club, so that he could concentrate on his law degree.

Outside Sport
James Averis is now a Housemaster and Geography teacher at Clifton College Preparatory School in Bristol. He continues to coach cricket (coaching the 1st XI) and rugby (coaching the 3rd XV) to the boys there as well as his normal teaching duties in Geography.

External links

1974 births
Living people
Alumni of St Cross College, Oxford
Bristol Bears players
Cricketers from Bristol
English cricketers
English rugby union players
Gloucestershire cricketers
Oxford University cricketers
Oxford University RFC players
People educated at Bristol Cathedral Choir School
Rugby union players from Bristol